Jesús Menéndez also known as Chaparra is a municipality and town in the Las Tunas Province of Cuba. It was named after the Cuban trade unionist .

Demographics
In 2004, the municipality of Jesús Menéndez had a population of 51,002.

See also
Municipalities of Cuba
List of cities in Cuba

References

External links

Populated places in Las Tunas Province